Richard Greaves Townley (20 July 1786 – 5 May 1855) was an English Whig politician.

He was elected at a by-election in November 1831 as a Member of Parliament (MP) for Cambridgeshire, and held the seat until his defeat at the 1835 general election.

He did not contest the 1841 general election, but regained the seat at the 1847 general election and held it until he stood down at the 1852 general election.

References

External links 
 

1786 births
1855 deaths
Whig (British political party) MPs for English constituencies
Members of the Parliament of the United Kingdom for English constituencies
UK MPs 1831–1832
UK MPs 1832–1835
UK MPs 1847–1852